HD 165516 is a blue supergiant star in the constellation Sagittarius.  It is part of the Sagittarius OB1 association and appears against a rich Milky Way starfield near the Triffid Nebula and Lagoon Nebula.

HD 165516 is close to a small reflection and emission nebula, and an associated loose open cluster. The nebula is catalogued as GN 18.05.6,  but was first listed as VdB 113. That name has since been used for the cluster itself, which is likely more distant than HD 165516. The whole cluster is less than a quarter of a degree across, with dozens of members from 8th magnitude downwards. V4381 Sagittarii is listed as a probable member, while HD 165516 and the nearby Wolf-Rayet star WR 111 are considered unlikely to be members.

References

External links
Image of VdB113 HD 165516 is the lower of the two bright white stars.

Sagittarius (constellation)
B-type supergiants
165516
088760
6762
Sagittarii, 30
BD-21 4855